The Football Association of Serbia Golden Ball is an annual award given to players and coaches who are adjudged to have been the best of the year in Serbian football. The award has been presented since 2005.

Winners

Footballer of the Year

Trivia

Female Footballer of the Year

Trivia

Coach of the Year

On the same occasion is also given an award for Serbian Football Coach of the Year.

See also
 Serbian Sportspersonality of the Year
 Awards of Olympic Committee of Serbia
 Serbian Basketball Player of the Year

References

Association football player of the year awards by nationality
Serbian football trophies and awards
Awards established in 2005
2005 establishments in Serbia
Annual events in Serbia
Association football player non-biographical articles